The 60th New York Infantry Regiment (aka "St. Lawrence Regiment") was an infantry regiment in the Union Army during the American Civil War. The regiment saw service in both the eastern and the western theaters of the American Civil War.

Service
The 60th New York Infantry was organized at Ogdensburg, New York beginning July 5, 1861 and mustered in for a three-year enlistment on October 30, 1861 under the command of Colonel William B. Hayward.

The regiment was attached to Dix's Division to March 1862. Railroad Brigade, Army of the Potomac, to June 1863. 2nd Brigade, Sigel's Division, Department of the Shenandoah, to June 26, 1862. 2nd Brigade, 2nd Division, II Corps, Pope's Army of Virginia, to August 1862. 3rd Brigade, 2nd Division, II Corps, Army of Virginia, to September 1862. 3rd Brigade, 2nd Division, XII Corps, Army of the Potomac, to October 1862. 2nd Brigade, 2nd Division, XII Corps, to May 1863. 3rd Brigade, 2nd Division, XII Corps, Army of the Potomac, to October 1863, and Army of the Cumberland to April 1864. 3rd Brigade, 2nd Division, XX Corps, Army of the Cumberland, to July 1865.

The 60th New York Infantry mustered out of service July 17, 1865.

Detailed service
The 60th New York's detailed service is as follows:

1861
 Left New York for Baltimore, Md., November 4, 1861. 
 Duty at Baltimore, Md., and between there and Washington, D.C.; also at Relay House, Md., and Harpers Ferry, Va., until June 1862.

1862
 Defense of Harpers Ferry May 28–30. 
 Operations in the Shenandoah Valley until August. 
 Pope's Campaign in northern Virginia August 16-September 2. 
 Sulphur Springs August 24. Battle of Groveton August 29. 
  Second Battle of Bull Run August 30. 
 Maryland Campaign September 6–22. 
 Battle of Antietam September 16–17. 
 Duty at Bolivar Heights until December. 
 Reconnaissance to Rippon, Va., November 9. 
 Expedition to Winchester December 2–6. 
 Marched to Fredericksburg, Va., December 9–16. 
 Duty at Fairfax until January 20, 1863.

1863
 "Mud March" January 20–24. 
 Chancellorsville Campaign April 27-May 6. 
 Battle of Chancellorsville May 1–5. 
 Gettysburg Campaign June 11-July 24. 
 Battle of Gettysburg July 1–3. 
 Pursuit of Lee to Manassas Gap, Va., July 5–24. 
 Duty on line of the Rappahannock until September 24. 
 Movement to Bridgeport, Ala., September 24-October 3. 
 Duty in Lookout Valley until November. 
 Reopening Tennessee River October 26–29. 
 Chattanooga-Ringgold Campaign November 23–27. 
 Battle of Lookout Mountain November 23–24. 
 Battle of Missionary Ridge November 25. 
 Battle of Ringgold Gap, Taylor's Ridge, November 27. 
 Duty at Bridgeport, Ala., until May 1864.

1864
 Scout from Stevenson to Caperton's Ferry April 11 (detachment). 
 Veterans on furlough December 1863-January 1864. 
 Atlanta Campaign May 1-September 8. 
 Operations about Rocky Faced Ridge, Tunnel Hill, and Buzzard's Roost May 8–11. 
 Battle of Resaca May 14–15. 
 Near Cassville May 19. 
 New Hope Church May 25. 
 Battles about Dallas, New Hope Church, and Allatoona Hills May 26-June 5. 
 Operations about Marietta and against Kennesaw Mountain June 10-July 2. 
 Pine Mountain June 11–14. 
 Ackworth June 12. 
 Lost Mountain June 15–17. 
 Gilgal or Golgotha Church June 15. 
 Muddy Creek June 17. 
 Noyes Creek June 19. 
 Kolb's Farm June 22. 
 Assault on Kennesaw June 27. 
 Ruff's Station, Smyrna Camp Ground, July 4. 
 Chattahoochee River July 6–17. 
 Peachtree Creek July 19–20. 
 Siege of Atlanta July 22-August 25. 
 Operations at Chattahoochie River Bridge August 26-September 2. 
 Occupation of Atlanta September 2 to November 15. 
 Expedition from Atlanta to Tuckum's Cross Roads October 26–29. 
 Near Atlanta November 9. 
 March to the sea November 15-December 10. 
 Near Davisboro November 28. 
 Siege of Savannah December 10–21.

1865
 Carolinas Campaign January to April 1865. 
 North Edisto River, S.C., February 12–13. 
 Battle of Bentonville, N.C., March 19–21. 
 Occupation of Goldsboro March 24. 
 Advance on Raleigh April 9–13. 
 Occupation of Raleigh April 14. 
 Bennett's House April 26. 
 Surrender of Johnston and his army. 
 March to Washington, D. C, via Richmond, Va., April 29-May 20. 
 Grand Review of the Armies May 24.

Casualties
The regiment lost a total of 168 men during service; 3 officers and 64 enlisted men killed or mortally wounded, 5 officers and 96 enlisted men died of disease, a total of 168.

Commanders
 Colonel William B. Hayward - removed from command in January 1862 at the petition of the regiment's company commanders
 Colonel George S. Greene - promoted to brigadier general April 28, 1862
 Colonel William B. Goodrich - mortally wounded in action at the Battle of Antietam while in brigade command
 Colonel Abel Godard - discharged September 13, 1864 due to disability
 Colonel Winslow M. Thomas - discharged April 3, 1865 due to disability
 Colonel Lester S. Willson
 Lieutenant Colonel Charles Russell Brundage - commanded at the Battle of Antietam
 Lieutenant Colonel John C. O. Redington - commanded at the Battle of Chancellorsville
 Lieutenant Colonel Lester S. Williams - commanded during the Carolinas Campaign
 Major Thomas Elliott - commanded during the March to the Sea

Notable members
 Brevet Major General George S. Greene, Commander - one of the oldest Generals during the Civil War, and one of the most aggressive union commanders too 
 Corporal Follett Johnson, Company H - Medal of Honor recipient for action at the Battle of New Hope Church

See also

 List of New York Civil War regiments
 New York in the Civil War
Roster of the 60th New York Infantry

References
 Dyer, Frederick H. A Compendium of the War of the Rebellion (Des Moines, IA:  Dyer Pub. Co.), 1908.
 Eddy, Richard. History of the Sixtieth Regiment New York State Volunteers: From the Commencement of Its Prganization in July, 1861, to Its Public Reception at Ogdensburgh as a Veteran Command, January 7th, 1864 (Philadelphia: The Author), 1864.
Attribution

External links
 National flag of the 60th New York Infantry
 60th New York Infantry Monument at Gettysburg Battlefield

Military units and formations established in 1861
1861 establishments in New York (state)
Military units and formations disestablished in 1865
Infantry 060